St. Andrew's Preparatory School is a private, co-educational boarding school in Makhanda (Grahamstown), Eastern Cape, South Africa.

History
The school was founded in 1885 and has an Anglican foundation.

A Family of schools
St. Andrew's Prep shares close ties with its brother school, St. Andrew's College, a high school for boys and its sister school, the Diocesan School for Girls (DSG); both are located in Grahamstown.

The school has boys and girls from the pre-primary level (Grade 000) to Grade 3, thereafter the girls move to DSG and boys only from Grade 4 to Grade 7.

Notable alumni
Ian Roberts – actorSharlto Copley – actorWilliam Smith (teacher) – Television mathematics & science teacher

External links
 

Anglican schools in South Africa
Boarding schools in South Africa
Private schools in the Eastern Cape
Educational institutions established in 1885
Buildings and structures in Makhanda, Eastern Cape
1885 establishments in the Cape Colony